The 2016 Gamba Osaka season was Gamba Osaka's 23rd season in the J1 League and 29th overall in the Japanese top flight.   Like the previous season, the 2016 campaign was split into two stages, with the first stage running from February to June, the second stage being held between July and November and finally a Championship stage in late November.   With city-rivals Cerezo Osaka failing to gain promotion from J2, Gamba's main rivalry match was the Hanshin derby against Vissel Kobe with an away game held in round 4 on the 19th March and the return home match in round 26 on August 20.   Gamba finished in 6th place in the first stage of the season and 4th place in the second stage for an overall 4th-place finish.

Gamba's position as runner-up in the 2015 J1 League Championship saw them automatically qualify for the 2016 AFC Champions League, their eighth appearance in the competition. Looking to improve on their run to the semi-finals in 2015, they were drawn into the tough looking Group G along with Australian side Melbourne Victory, South Korea's Suwon Samsung Bluewings and big-spending Chinese outfit Shanghai SIPG. The group stage kicked off on Wednesday 24 February and concluded on Tuesday 3 May with all sides in the group playing each other home and away in a round-robin basis. Gamba were eliminated at the group stage with only 2 points from 6 games to show for their efforts.

As winners of the 2015 Emperor's Cup, Gamba competed in the season opening Japanese Super Cup, held in Yokohama on 20 February. The annually held match pitted Gamba against Sanfrecce Hiroshima, the side who defeated them in the final of the 2015 J1 League Championship. This was Gamba's 6th appearance in the Super Cup, however they were unable to build on their previous victories in 2007 and 2015 and lost 3-1. Trailing 2-0 due to early second half goals from Satō and Asano, top scorer of the previous 3 campaigns Takashi Usami pulled one back, however Utaka added a third for Hiroshima shortly afterwards to seal the win.

Later on in the season, Gamba entered the 2016 J.League Cup and 2016 Emperor's Cup. Due to their AFC Champions League commitments, they were given a bye past the J.League Cup group stage and entered in the quarter-finals. Similarly they entered the Emperor's Cup in the 4th round. They went all the way to the final of the J.League cup for the 3rd time in a row, however they lost out to the Urawa Red Diamonds in a penalty shoot-out. In the Emperor's Cup, they bowed out to Yokohama F. Marinos in the quarter-finals meaning that this would be their first season without any silverware since 2012.

This was Gamba's first season playing at the newly opened Suita City Football Stadium which was built in the same park as Osaka Expo '70 Stadium, their home from 1980–2015.   The first official game to be held in the new stadium was on 14 February 2016, the pre-season Panasonic Cup match between Gamba and Nagoya Grampus which the home side won 3-1.   The first league match was held in front of 32,463 spectators on 28 February against Kashima Antlers.   It resulted in a 1-0 defeat against the team which went on to win the first stage of the 2016 J1 League   The move to the new stadium was a huge success in terms of increasing attendance with average league attendances increasing from 15,999 in 2015 to 25,342 in 2016.

Transfers

Coming off the back of a draining 2015 season which saw them play 60 games in all competitions, Gamba sought to add depth to their squad.   In came experienced former Shimizu S-Pulse, Nagoya Grampus, Yokohama F. Marinos and Japan national team midfielder Jungo Fujimoto to compete for a right-wing slot with Hiroyuki Abe and Kotaro Omori.   Ademilson who had spent the previous campaign as Fujimoto's teammate in Yokohama, moved west to Osaka on a season-long loan deal from São Paulo FC in his homeland.   He is expected to battle with Shu Kurata for a place playing just off target-man  Patric.   In addition, Hiroto Goya, a prolific scorer at varsity level for Kwansei Gakuin University signed up for his first shot at professional football and two youngsters, Hiroki Noda and Kazunari Ichimi joined from Otsu High School in Kumamoto Prefecture.   Noda, a native of Kumamoto has actually turned out for his local side Roasso Kumamoto on 5 occasions over the previous 2 seasons despite his tender age of just 18.

There were fewer departures than arrivals during the close season and crucially no starting-eleven members from the previous year were amongst those to leave.   Veteran midfielder Tomokazu Myojin made a surprising move to Nagoya Grampus at the ripe-old age of 38 following 10 years of sterling service to the club.   Brazilian attacker Lins was also released.   A promising debut season in 2014 which saw him net 8 times in 39 games including several crucial late winners gave way to a disappointing 2015 in which he started only 8 games and could only net 4 goals in 36 games in all competitions, therefore it was no surprise when his departure was announced.   Finally, Shingo Akamine a close-season signing from Vegalta Sendai the previous year and who, like Lins had endured a frustrating 2015, announced he would be joining J2 side Fagiano Okayama on loan for 2016.

In addition to those main transfers; Kenya Okazaki, Naoki Ogawa and Shōhei Ogura rejoined the club following loan spells at Ehime FC, Fujieda MYFC and Montedio Yamagata respectively while Yuto Uchida who spent the 2015 season with Tokushima Vortis made his loan move into a permanent one.

In the summer transfer window, the big news was the departure of star attacker Takashi Usami to German Bundesliga side Augsburg.   The move came 3 years after Usami had returned to Gamba following spells abroad with Bayern Munich and Hoffenheim.   He had finished as the club's leading goalscorer in 2013, 2014 and 2015 and was again leading the Gamba goalscoring charts with 6 goals at the time of his departure.   Veteran midfielder Takahiro Futagawa, who had spent most of the first half of the season with Gamba's Under-23 side in J3, also moved on and joined Tokyo Verdy on loan for the remaining six months of the campaign.

Brazilian forward Patric, who had endured a hugely disappointing campaign, injured his knee in October and was released by the club in order to complete his rehabilitation in his native country.   Also in October, Patric's compatriot, Ademilson, turned his loan move from São Paulo into a permanent one.

In

Out

First team squad

* indicates player returned to Gamba Osaka from a loan spell with this club.

Pre-season friendlies

Japanese Super Cup

As winners of the 2015 Emperor's Cup, Gamba squared off against reigning J1 League champions Sanfrecce Hiroshima at Nissan Stadium, Yokohama.   The match ended up in a 3-1 defeat for Gamba, with Hisato Satō opening the scoring for Sanfrecce in the 52nd minute and Takuma Asano adding a second from the penalty spot 5 minutes later.   Takashi Usami pulled a goal back for Gamba in the 68th minute but it wasn't enough as Sanfrecce's new Nigerian signing Peter Utaka wrapped up the game with 17 minutes remaining.   The result means that Gamba have now won just 2 of their 6 appearances in the Japanese Super Cup with victories in 2007 and 2015 and defeats in 2006, 2009, 2010 and 2016.   One other point to note is that this game saw the competitive debuts in a Gamba shirt for attacking midfielders Ademilson and Jungo Fujimoto, both of whom joined from Yokohama F. Marinos in the close season.

J1 League First Stage

The first half of the 2016 J1 League season was a disappointing one for Gamba and ended up in a 6th-place finish.   Results were wildly inconsistent with 7 wins 3 draws and 7 defeats.  Goalscoring was a real issue, especially early on, with only 9 goals in their first 10 games.   They also failed to score more than once in 11 out of their 17 games.

Gameweeks 11-17 which fell after their exit from the AFC Champions League brought more goals but, also saw what had been a pretty solid defence become more porous.   3-3 draws at home to two struggling sides, Shonan Bellmare and Nagoya Grampus, summed up this stage of the campaign.

In terms of team selection, the early weeks of the season where Gamba had to balance J1 League and Champions League commitments saw coach Kenta Hasegawa rotate his squad a lot.   The full back and attacking midfield berths saw the most instability.   While an injury to South Korean full-back Oh Jae-suk and the game time allowed to youngster Ryo Hatsuse with Gamba's Under-23 side in J3 saw Koki Yonekura and Hiroki Fujiharu become the established right-back and left-back respectively, the strongest combination of attacking midfielders in the favoured 4-2-3-1 formation was never determined.   Takashi Usami, Shu Kurata, Hiroyuki Abe and Kotaro Omori had all been retained from the previous year, where the latter 3 tended to be rotated.   However, the close-season signings of Ademilson and Jungo Fujimoto from Yokohama F. Marinos gave Gamba excessive depth in that area.   Ademilson acquitted himself well with 4 goals which came both from attacking midfield and also centre-forward, however Fujimoto struggled to establish himself and had to turn out occasionally for Gamba U-23 to get game time after Gamba's Champions League elimination.

Returning to the theme of goalscoring, perhaps the biggest concern from the first half of the season was the poor goal return of Patric who failed to find the target in 13 appearances.   Following two goal-laden seasons in which he and Usami had scored 50 goals between them, they could only muster 6 goals during the first 17 games of this campaign.   Indeed, Patric often found himself playing off the bench with his compatriot Ademilson or the tall Shun Nagasawa starting in his place.   In light of this, Usami's departure for Germany in mid-season would prove to be a major worry for Gamba going forward.

Results

Match Day Line-Ups

The following players appeared for Gamba Osaka during the 2016 J1 League First Stage:

 = Substitute on,  = Substitute Off,  = Number of goals scored,  = Yellow Card and  = Red Card.

J1 League Second Stage

Freed from Asian Champions League commitments, Gamba performed much better during the second stage of the 2016 J1 League season finishing with a record of 10 wins, 4 draws and 3 defeats which saw them come home in 4th place in both the second stage and overall league tables.   Impressive away victories over Kashima Antlers and Kawasaki Frontale bookended what was a half of the season largely full of positives.

The mid-season departure of Takashi Usami was not felt as keenly as first feared with the team netting 31 times in 17 games, Shun Nagasawa found the back of the net 6 times, Ademilson 5 and impressive central-midfielder Yosuke Ideguchi, buoyed by his appearance in the Olympics provided 4 in what was a great overall team effort.

The only negatives were the disappointing 0-0 draw at home to league whipping boys Avispa Fukuoka, the painful 1-0 derby defeat against Vissel Kobe in which Ademilson missed a penalty which would have salvaged a draw and also the chastening 4-0 reverse away to second stage champions Urawa Red Diamonds.

Gamba's 4th-place finish in the overall standings left them waiting on the result of the Emperor's Cup to know whether or not they had qualified for the following season's Champions League.

Match Day Line-Ups

The following players appeared for Gamba Osaka during the 2016 J1 League Second Stage:

 = Substitute on,  = Substitute Off,  = Number of goals scored,  = Yellow Card and  = Red Card.

AFC Champions League

Gamba were drawn in Group G along with Australian side Melbourne Victory, Korean outfit Suwon Samsung Bluewings and China's Shanghai SIPG.   It was to prove a disappointing campaign for them culminating in an exit at the group stage, a strong contrast with the previous season's run to the semi-finals.   An inability to find the back of the net which had plagued their early form in J1 also proved to be their downfall in the Champions League with only 4 goals scored in 6 games.

Draws in their opening two games away to Samsung and at home to Melbourne were to prove the high points as they were followed by a run of four defeats in a row, three of which came by a solitary goal.   As it happened, Sven-Göran Eriksson's Shanghai side ran out group winners with 12 points, 3 ahead of both Melbourne and Samsung on 9.   It was Melbourne who advanced with them, with their final round win over a largely second string Gamba side giving them the points they required to overtake Suwon due to having a better head-to-head record in matches played between the two sides.   Gamba finished fourth and last in the group.

Results

Match Day Line-Ups

The following players appeared for Gamba Osaka during the 2016 AFC Champions League:

 = Substitute on,  = Substitute Off,  = Number of goals scored,  = Yellow Card and  = Red Card.

J.League Cup

As a result of their qualification for the AFC Champions League, Gamba were given a bye into the quarter-finals of the League Cup, where they were paired against Sanfrecce Hiroshima in a two-legged encounter.   A 1-1 draw in Hiroshima was followed by an emphatic 6-3 home win for Gamba which saw them qualify for the semi-finals and a tie against Yokohama F. Marinos in October.   The first leg, held in Osaka, finished 0-0 and the second leg was also a draw, this time 1-1 which saw Gamba through on away goals and paved the way for a 3rd league cup final appearance in 3 years.   The final was played against Urawa Red Diamonds at Saitama Stadium 2002 on Saturday 15 October 2016.

A solo run by Ademilson gave Gamba a first half lead which lasted until the 76th minute when Tadanari Lee's header squared things up.   Extra-time followed and Gamba came agonisingly close to netting the winner in the 120th minute when Hiroto Goya's shot was deflected past the goalkeeper and onto the post, it then proceeded to roll along the goal line before being swept to safety by Urawa defender Ryota Moriwaki.   It was perhaps an omen as following 3 successful penalty kicks for each side, Goya had his spot-kick saved by Shusaku Nishikawa.   This proved to be the decisive miss as the Reds netted all of their penalties and went on to win the shootout 5-4.

This was Gamba's 5th appearance in the J.League Cup final and their 3rd in as many years.   To date they have lifted the trophy twice, in 2007 and 2014 with this defeat being their 3rd defeat in the final, following reverses in 2005 and 2015.

Match Day Line-Ups

The following players appeared for Gamba Osaka during the 2016 J.League Cup:

 = Substitute on,  = Substitute Off,  = Number of goals scored,  = Yellow Card and  = Red Card.

Emperor's Cup

Gamba began their defence of the title they've won for the past 2 seasons at home to J2 side Shimizu S-Pulse on November 9.  Shun Nagasawa's strike in extra time was enough to see them through to the quarter-finals where they were paired with Yokohama F. Marinos in what would be the 5th meeting of the season between the two teams.   Having already drawn twice at Nissan Stadium earlier in the season, this was once again a tight affair with Manabu Saitō putting the Marinos ahead from the penalty spot in the 63rd minute only for Yasuyuki Konno to seemingly send the tie into extra time with an 87th-minute equaliser.   Unfortunately for Gamba, Jun Amano had other ideas and his 96th-minute strike from outside the box sent them through to the semi-finals and left Gamba hoping Kashima or Kawasaki would lift the cup to ensure their progression to the 2017 Asian Champions League.

Match Day Line-Ups

The following players appeared for Gamba Osaka during the 2016 Emperor's Cup:

  = Substitute on,  = Substitute Off,  = Number of goals scored,  = Yellow Card and  = Red Card.

Squad statistics

Statistics accurate as of match played on 24 December 2016.

References

Gamba Osaka
Gamba Osaka seasons